The  is a facility that traverses a steep incline in a residential area of Kobe, Japan. It can be considered as a sort of small funicular or incline elevator. There are many other similar facilities in the country, although they are relatively unknown.

Residents of Hanayama use this funicular to quickly reach the nearby train station. It is reliable and convenient. It's of the functional type and doesn't tend to attract tourism; save the odd visitor unfamiliar with funiculars.

See also
List of funicular railways
Slope car

References 

Funicular railways in Japan